Michael J. O'Connor (December 15, 1928 – October 24, 2018) was an American politician in the state of South Dakota. He was a member of the South Dakota House of Representatives and South Dakota State Senate. He was President Pro Tempore of the Senate from 1975 to 1976.

O'Connor was an alumnus of Augustana College and was a printing executive and owner of O'Connor Printers. O'Connor was a farmer. He served in the United States Marine Corps. O'Connor also served on the Minnehaha County Commission. O'Connor died at the Sioux Falls VA Hospital in Sioux Falls, South Dakota.

References

2018 deaths
1928 births
Democratic Party members of the South Dakota House of Representatives
Democratic Party South Dakota state senators
Politicians from Sioux Falls, South Dakota
Military personnel from South Dakota
Augustana University alumni
Businesspeople from South Dakota
Farmers from South Dakota
People from Brandon, South Dakota
20th-century American businesspeople